The 1918 Camp Devens football team was an American football team that represented the United States Army stationed at Camp Devens in Ayer, Massachusetts, during the 1918 fall football season. George Hoban served as both the team captain and coach. The team compiled a 4–2 record.

Schedule

References

Camp Devens
Camp Devens football